Chernyshevsky District is an administrative and municipal district (raion), one of the thirty-one in Zabaykalsky Krai, Russia. It is located in the center of the krai and borders Tungokochensky District in the north, Sretensky District in the east,  District in the south, and Nerchinsky District in the west. Its administrative center is the urban locality (an urban-type settlement) of Chernyshevsk. As of the 2010 Census, the total population of the district was 35,019, with the population of Chernyshevsk accounting for 38.2% of that number.

History
The district was established on January 4, 1926 by merging Chernyshevskaya, Kalininskaya, and Zyulzinskaya Volosts of Nerchinsky Uyezd. It was abolished and split between Mogochinsky, Nerchinsky, and Shilkinsky Districts in February 1963, but reinstated in modern borders in January 1965.

References

Notes

Sources

Districts of Zabaykalsky Krai
States and territories established in 1926
States and territories disestablished in 1963
States and territories established in 1965
